The Tetris effect occurs when people devote so much time and attention to an activity that it begins to pattern their thoughts, mental images, and dreams. It takes its name from the video game Tetris. 

People who have played Tetris for a prolonged amount of time can find themselves thinking about ways different shapes in the real world can fit together, such as the boxes on a supermarket shelf or the buildings on a street. They may see colored images of pieces falling into place on an invisible layout at the edges of their visual fields or when they close their eyes. They may see such colored, moving images when they are falling asleep, a form of hypnagogic imagery.

Those experiencing the effect may feel they are unable to prevent the thoughts, images, or dreams from happening.

A more comprehensive understanding of the lingering effects of playing video games has been investigated empirically as game transfer phenomena (GTP).

Other examples

The Tetris effect can occur with other video games. It has also been known to occur with non-video games, such as the illusion of curved lines after doing a jigsaw puzzle, the checker pattern of a chess board (or imagining chess pieces in unrelated objects or phenomena), or the involuntary mental visualisation of Rubik's Cube algorithms common among speedcubers.

The earliest example that relates to a computer game was created by the game Spacewar! As documented in Steven Levy's book Hackers: "Peter Samson, second only to Saunders in Spacewarring, realized this one night when he went home to Lowell. As he stepped out of the train, he stared upward into the crisp, clear sky. A meteor flew overhead. Where's the spaceship? Samson thought as he instantly swiveled back and grabbed the air for a control box that wasn’t there." (p. 52.)

Robert Stickgold reported on his own experiences of proprioceptive imagery from rock climbing. Another example, sea legs, are a kind of Tetris effect.  A person newly on land after spending long periods at sea may sense illusory rocking motion, having become accustomed to the constant work of adjusting to the boat making such movements (see "Illusions of self-motion" and "Mal de debarquement"). The poem "Boots" by Rudyard Kipling describes the effect, resulting from repetitive visual experience during a route march:

Mathematicians have reported dreaming of numbers or equations; for example Srinivasa Ramanujan, or Friedrich Engel, who remarked "last week in a dream I gave a chap my shirt-buttons to differentiate, and he ran off with them".

Place in cognition
Stickgold et al. (2000) have proposed that Tetris-effect imagery is a separate form of memory, likely related to procedural memory. This is from their research in which they showed that people with anterograde amnesia, unable to form new declarative memories, reported dreaming of falling shapes after playing Tetris during the day, despite not being able to remember playing the game at all.

Game transfer phenomena 
A series of empirical studies with over 6,000 gamers has been conducted since 2010 into game transfer phenomena (GTP), a broadening of the Tetris effect concept coined by Angelica B. Ortiz de Gortari in her thesis. GTP is not limited to altered visual perceptions or mental processes but also includes auditory, tactile and kinaesthetic sensory perceptions, sensations of unreality, and automatic behaviours with video game content. GTP establishes the differences between endogenous (e.g., seeing images with closed eyes, hearing music in the head) and exogenous phenomena (e.g., seeing power bars above people's head, hearing sounds coming from objects associated with a video game) and between involuntary (e.g., saying something involuntarily with video game content) and voluntary behaviours (e.g., using slang from the video game for amusement).

History
The earliest known reference to the term appears in Jeffrey Goldsmith's article, "This is Your Brain on Tetris", published in Wired in May 1994:
No home was sweet without a Game Boy in 1990. That year, I stayed "for a week" with a friend in Tokyo, and Tetris enslaved my brain. At night, geometric shapes fell in the darkness as I lay on loaned tatami floor space. Days, I sat on a lavender suede sofa and played Tetris furiously. During rare jaunts from the house, I visually fit cars and trees and people together. [...]

The Tetris effect is a biochemical, reductionistic metaphor, if you will, for curiosity, invention, the creative urge. To fit shapes together is to organize, to build, to make deals, to fix, to understand, to fold sheets. All of our mental activities are analogous, each as potentially addictive as the next.
The term was rediscovered by Earling (1996), citing a use of the term by Garth Kidd in February 1996. Kidd described "after-images of the game for up to days afterwards" and "a tendency to identify everything in the world as being made of four squares and attempt to determine 'where it fits in'". Kidd attributed the origin of the term to computer-game players from Adelaide, Australia. The earliest description of the general phenomenon appears in Neil Gaiman's science fiction poem "Virus" (1987) in Digital Dreams. The ending of The Witness resembles the Tetris effect, where the unnamed protagonist is taken out of the game's virtual reality and sees the game's puzzles in real-world objects. It is also suggested as early as 1930 in Vladimir Nabokov’s novel The Defence, featuring a chess player who begins to see elements of Chess in real-world situations, eventually driving him to madness.

In 2018, the term was announced as the name of a new Tetris game on the PlayStation 4 by Enhance.

See also
 Automaticity
 Domino effect
 Earworm
 Fixation (psychology)
 Highway hypnosis
 Neuroplasticity
 Tetromino
 Video game addiction
 Phantom vibration syndrome
 Derealization

References

External links
 Tetris dreams - Scientific American magazine, October 2000
 Game Transfer Phenomena
 FR Legends 2023

Tetris
Memory
1994 introductions
Attention